The serratus posterior inferior muscle, also known as the posterior serratus muscle, is a muscle of the human body.

Structure
The muscle is situated at the junction of the thoracic and lumbar regions. It has an irregularly quadrilateral form, broader than the serratus posterior superior muscle, and separated from it by a wide interval.

It arises by a thin aponeurosis from the spinous processes of the lower two thoracic and upper two or three lumbar vertebrae.

Passing obliquely upward and lateralward, it becomes fleshy, and divides into four flat digitations. These are inserted into the inferior borders of the lower four ribs, a little beyond their angles.

The thin aponeurosis of origin is intimately blended with the thoracolumbar fascia, and aponeurosis of the latissimus dorsi muscle.

Function
The serratus posterior inferior draws the lower ribs backward and downward to assist in rotation and extension of the trunk. This movement of the ribs may also contribute to inhalation and forced expiration of air from the lungs.

Additional images

See also
 Serratus anterior muscle
 Serratus posterior superior muscle

References

External links

  - "Intermediate layer of the extrinsic muscles of the back, deep muscles."
 

Muscles of the torso